is a Japanese idol and singer.She debuted as member number 29 of the idol group Onyanko Club. As she was one of the most popular members, in 1986 she started releasing solo songs. Her solo career continued after the group disbanded in 1987.

Biography
She has an elder brother, an elder sister, and a younger sister. She was born in Gifu Prefecture, but moved to Nishikasugai District in Aichi Prefecture when she was two years old. Her father owned a construction company.

This led to her being scouted by CBS Sony Records. She also joined , a leading entertainment agency, thus she quit high school and moved to Tokyo. Unlike usually, the audition at this time was a joint project with the popular radio program , featuring comedian  as DJ, and they were also looking for a poster girl for the radio program. In December 1985, she and Yokota became regular performers on a radio program called , featuring Sonoko Kawai and Sayuri Kokushō as DJs.

In February 1986, when Kokushō made her solo debut with the song Valentine Kiss, she and Mako Shiraishi served as backing vocalists. In March 1986, Kawai and Kokushō left the radio program, and Shiraishi was joined as a new DJ. Shortly thereafter, Watanabe caused controversy by saying on the program that "the old ladies were no longer here". In response, Kawai retorted, "When Minayo-chan turns 20, will you be able to maintain your youthfulness like I have?"  In April 1986, she enrolled at Horikoshi High School, where many celebrities have attended. In July 1986, a large-scale  was held at the Nippon Budokan, and she shook hands with 12,000 fans who gathered there. Shortly thereafter, she made her solo debut with the song , which ranked No. 1 on the Oricon in its first appearance. As a result, she had five consecutive No. 1 songs since her debut as a solo singer. In November 1986, she released her debut album called .

In January 1987, she suddenly started crying while singing her new song  on Yūyake Nyan Nyan. The reason was that she was emotionally unstable due to a poor rehearsal for a popular singing show called . In April 1987, she started a radio program called . She remained with the group until September 1987, when Onyanko Club disbanded. She was positioned as a new leader of Onyanko Club. She was considered a legitimate beauty among the Onyanko Club members, many of whom were said to be not very good looking. In addition, Yasushi Akimoto, who was deeply involved with Onyanko Club, described her as "like she was born to be an idol." Since her debut as a solo singer in July 1986, she remained one of the most popular members of the group.

In the mid-1990s, she released several semi-nude photo books. In 1996, she married , a member of the rockabilly band Hot Sox, and had two children. When she gave birth to her first son in 1997, she released a video of the birth. In 2002, she participated in the reunion of Onyanko Club. She has since continued her entertainment career while also being involved in a nail salon and an interior design store. In addition, her two sons also made their debut in the entertainment industry.

Discography

Singles

Albums

Studio albums

Best-of albums

Videos

Further reading

References

External links 
  
 Official profile at Ever Green Entertainment Group 
 Official profile at Cast Corporation & Office May 
 Minayo Land - Official blog 
 

1969 births
Living people
Japanese idols
Japanese women pop singers
Onyanko Club
Musicians from Aichi Prefecture